37-mm trench gun M1915 was a Russian battalion gun employed in World War I.

With World War I switching into a trench warfare phase late in 1914, a need for a highly mobile artillery system to be used against enemy machine gun emplacements and other strongpoints became apparent. In 1915 colonel M. F. Rosenberg, a member of the Artillery Committee, developed such a weapon. The gun was compact enough to fit into machine gun emplacements. It weighed only about 180 kg and could be dismantled into three pieces - barrel (about 74 kg), carriage (82 kg) and wheels (25 kg), making it easy to move around. To protect the crew from enemy fire, the gun was equipped with a shield 6 or 8 mm thick. The weapon was sufficiently accurate at ranges of up to roughly 1 mile or about 1.6 km—this was earlier set out as 1,000-1,200 paces, and a pace is normally the height of the person walking, so this is not a uniform measure.

Similar Weapons 
3.7 cm Infanteriegeschütz M.15
3.7 cm TAK 1918
 Canon d'Infanterie de 37 modèle 1916 TRP
 Type 11 37 mm infantry gun

Notes

External links

37 K/15 at jaegerplatoon.net

World War I guns
World War I artillery of Russia
37 mm artillery
Weapons and ammunition introduced in 1915